Iğdır Airport  is a public airport in Iğdır, located in Iğdır Province, Turkey.

Airlines and destinations

Traffic Statistics

Trivia
The airport was depicted in a Turkish Airlines advertisement, where a group of kids trying to ask the Turkish Airlines aircraft to land at their town (and their own made airport), and little to their knowledge that a real airport was constructed.

The airport was depicted also in Turkish Airlines commercial series of "Delightful Stories", where András Földvári, then head of marketing in Turkish Airlines' Hungary Office, flew from Budapest to Iğdır to explore Noah's Ark.

External links
 http://airlineroute.net/2012/07/19/tk7-igd-jul12/
 http://www.airporthaber.com/havacilik-haberleri/igdir-havalimani-cuma-gunu-aciliyor.html
 http://www.airporthaber.com/havacilik-haberleri/basbakandan-kuleden-ucaga-anons.html
 http://www.hurriyetdailynews.com/eastern-province-of-igdir-welcomes-airport.aspx?pageID=238&nID=25463&NewsCatID=345
 http://www.turkishairlines.com/tr-tr/kurumsal/haberler/13092/yeni-ucuslarimiz-igdir

References

Airports in Turkey
Buildings and structures in Iğdır Province
Transport in Iğdır Province